Sabina Khatun (born 25 October 1993) is a Bangladeshi international footballer who plays as a forward for FAM Women's Football Championship club Maldives Army FC and Bangladesh women's national football team. Currently, she is the captain of Bashundhara Kings Women and Bangladesh women's national football team. She holds the record of most international goals for Bangladesh (31), male or female. She is also the all-time top goalscorer (male or female) in Bangladeshi club football, with 314 goals.

Early years
Khatun was born on 25 October 1993 in Satkhira. She is the fourth child of Md. Syed Ghazi and Mumtaz Begum. Khatun's relationship with football started back in 2007 when she was in class eight. She was introduced to football by the Satkhira district football coach Akbar. She was called up to the Bangladesh women's national football team after finding success at the school, inter-school and inter-district levels.

International career
In 2009, Khatun received her first call-up to the Bangladesh national team, which she has captained since 2015.

Career statistics

International

International goals

Scores and results list Bangladesh's goal tally first, score column indicates score after each Sabina Khatun goal.

U19

Honours

Personal
 Anannya Top Ten Awards : 2016

Club 
Sheikh Jamal Dhanmondi Women

 Bangladesh Women's Football League
Winners (1): 2011
Bashundhara Kings Women

 Bangladesh Women's Football League
 Winners (3): 2019–20, 2020–21, 2021–22

International 
SAFF Women's Championship
Champion : 2022
Runner-up : 2016
South Asian Games
Bronze : 2010
Bronze : 2016

References

External links

1993 births
Living people
Bangladesh women's international footballers
Bangladeshi women's footballers
Women's association football forwards
People from Satkhira District
Sethu FC players
Bangladesh Women's Football League players
Expatriate women's footballers in India
Bangladeshi expatriate sportspeople in India
Bangladeshi women's futsal players
South Asian Games bronze medalists for Bangladesh
South Asian Games medalists in football
Indian Women's League players